Matthew Mahoney (born April 17, 1995) is an American professional soccer player who currently plays in the USL Championship for Colorado Springs Switchbacks.

Career

Youth and college 
Mahoney played four years of college soccer at Temple University between 2013 and 2016, where he made 78 appearances, scoring five goals and tallying three assists.

Mahoney  also played with Premier Development League side Jersey Express during his time at college.

Professional 
Mahoney signed with United Soccer League side Bethlehem Steel on March 3, 2017. He made his professional debut on May 13, 2017 as a late substitute during a 1–0 win over Toronto FC II.

References

External links 
 
 
 Bethlehem Steel FC player profile

1995 births
Living people
American soccer players
Association football defenders
Philadelphia Union II players
Jersey Express S.C. players
Sacramento Republic FC players
Colorado Springs Switchbacks FC players
Soccer players from New York (state)
Sportspeople from Buffalo, New York
Temple Owls men's soccer players
USL Championship players
USL League Two players